The People's Temple may refer to:

"The People's Temple" (audio drama), a segment of the 1999 Doctor Who audio drama Earth and Beyond
"The People's Temple", a 1998 Doctor Who short story by Paul Leonard in the first BBC Short Trips book; basis for the audio drama
The People's Temple (band), an American garage rock band
Peoples Temple, a religious organization founded by Jim Jones